Elisabetta Pacella (born 3 May 1994) is an Italian field hockey player for the Italian national team.

She participated at the 2018 Women's Hockey World Cup.

References

1994 births
Living people
Italian female field hockey players
Female field hockey forwards
Expatriate field hockey players
Italian expatriate sportspeople in Spain